Verena Peter (born 1954) is a German actress. She played several roles in the popular TV series Derrick.

Selected filmography
 Derrick - Season 7, Episode 7: "Der Tod sucht Abonnenten" (1980)
 Derrick - Season 8, Episode 4: "Eine Ganz Alte Geschichte" (1981)
 Derrick - Season 10, Episode 6: "Tödliches Rendezvous" (1983)
 Derrick - Season 11, Episode 7: "Ein Spiel mit dem Tod" (1984)
 Derrick - Season 11, Episode 14: "Stellen Sie sich vor, man hat Dr. Prestel erschossen" (1984)

External links

ZBF Agency Berlin 

German television actresses
1954 births
Living people
20th-century German actresses
21st-century German actresses